Saikoloni Pasoni Hala (born 20 December 1963) is a Tongan boxer. He competed in the men's welterweight event at the 1984 Summer Olympics. During the Olympics, he competed against Vedat Onsoy from Turkey. However, he lost to Onsoy.

Personal life 
Two of his cousins were captured by the U.S. Immigration and Customs Enforcement for illegal immigration.

References

External links
 

1963 births
Living people
Welterweight boxers
Tongan male boxers
Olympic boxers of Tonga
Boxers at the 1984 Summer Olympics
Place of birth missing (living people)